Karagarer Rojnamcha (English: The Prison Diaries) is the second memoir by Sheikh Mujibur Rahman, founding father and the 1st President of Bangladesh. Bangla Academy published the book on the occasion of Mujib's 98th birth anniversary.

Background
Mujib used to note his daily life in his personal diary while in jail. Pakistani government seized his six diaries when he got released from jail. Four of them were returned later. In 2009, after the Mujibs' eldest child Sheikh Hasina's government came to power, the remaining two diaries were recovered with the help of the Special Branch. These two diaries are published as Karagarer Rojnamcha. After the publication of the book, Bangla Academy's Director General Shamsuzzanan Khan handed over the copies of the book to the Mujib's two living children, Prime minister  Sheikh Hasina and his younger daughter Sheikh Rehana at Ganabhaban in the afternoon.

Content
In the book/diary, Mujib noted his prison life during the Pakistan regime from 1966 to 1968. He provides a comprehensive account of jail customs and conventions, his political view, and his pain for being separated from his family.

References

Books about Bangladesh
Political autobiographies
Unfinished books
History books about Bangladesh
Bangladeshi books
Books about Sheikh Mujibur Rahman
Bangladeshi non-fiction books